John Thorn may refer to:

John Thorn, a sports historian.
John Leonard Thorn (born 1925), English schoolmaster and writer
John Thorn (musician)
John Thorn (Queensland politician)

See also
John Thorne (disambiguation)